Channa aurolineata is a species of Asian snakehead in the family Channidae. It is found natively in most of Myanmar's waterways as well as the Mae Khlong drainage in Thailand. There is also an invasive population found in Southeast Florida, United States. This species was recently split from C. marulius, the bullseye snakehead, and confirmed as a separate species in 2018; and the Florida and Thailand populations were not discovered to be C. aurolineata until even more recently in 2019. Before this, the Thailand population's species was unknown and the Florida ones were assumed to be C. marulius. C. aurolineata was able to be separated as a new species and identified in other areas due to slight differences in color pattern, lateral line scale and fin ray morphology, and DNA structure from the other species in the marulius complex.

References

aurolineata
Fish of Myanmar
Fish of Thailand
Fish described in 1870